Vision Australia Radio is a network of eight radio stations in Victoria, amongst some other states in Australia. It is owned by Vision Australia. The stations broadcast a range of programs, generally consisting of readings of newspapers and magazines for people unable to read print media.  All the stations are operated by a volunteer staff and a small group of employees.

The Vision Australia Radio Network is headquartered at Kooyong and is licensed as a Community (RPH) Broadcaster to the print-handicapped community. This can include people with vision impairment, a physical illness or disability which makes it difficult for them to hold a paper (such as MS, or Parkinson's), people with dyslexia or those who understand spoken but not written English.

A recent McNair Ingenuity Research study showed that Vision Australia Radio has a statewide audience of more than 250,000 every week – with the majority of listeners aged between 25 and 54. An estimated 38% of listeners are professionals or self-employed with a further 36% skilled workers.

The station originally broadcast as 3RPH in 1982 from Melbourne, however the station is now formally known as Vision Australia Radio.

Vision Australia Radio is a member of the Radio Print Handicapped Network and a BBC World Service partner station.

Melbourne station - VAR 1179AM

The chief station is:
3RPH 1179 kHz AM Melbourne

Regional stations

The other stations are affiliates and opt out of the 3RPH feed for local programmes:

2APH 101.7 MHz FM Albury-Wodonga
3BPH 88.7 MHz FM Bendigo
3GPH 99.5 MHz FM Geelong
3MPH 107.5 MHz FM Mildura
3SPH 100.1 MHz FM Shepparton
3RPH/T 93.5 MHz FM Warragul 
3RPH/T 882 kHz AM Warrnambool (Previously 94.5 FM)

The Melbourne station is also heard in Australia and New Zealand on Optus Aurora satellite radio channel 12, as well as VAST satellite radio channel 632.

References 

Radio stations in Victoria
Radio stations in New South Wales
Radio reading services of Australia
Radio stations established in 1982
1982 establishments in Australia